Provincial Road 455 (PR 455) is a provincial road in the southwest part of the Canadian province of Manitoba.

Route description 
Provincial Road 455 is an east–west route and runs from PR 250 near Alexander to its terminus at PTH 21 just east of the Sioux Valley Dakota Nation.

PR 455 is a gravel road for its entire length, and runs entirely within the Rural Municipality of Whitehead.

History
Prior to 1949, PR 455 was part of the original Highway 1.
The route was given its current designation when the Manitoba government implemented its secondary highway system in 1966.

References

External links 
Manitoba Official Map - Southwest

455